Unsub is an American television series that aired on NBC from February 3 to April 14, 1989. The series revolves around an elite FBI forensic team that investigates serial murderers and other violent crimes. Unsub is an abbreviation for the "unknown subject" of an investigation.

Cast
 David Soul as John Westley "Wes" Grayson
 M. Emmet Walsh as Ned Platt
 Kent McCord as Alan McWhirter
 Andrea Mann as Norma McWhirter
 Jennifer Hetrick as Ann Madison
 Richard Kind as Jimmy Bello
 Joe Maruzzo as Tony D'Agostino

Episodes

Home media
On July 27, 2010, Mill Creek Entertainment released Prime Time Crime: The Stephen J. Cannell Collection on DVD in Region 1. This special collection contains 54 episodes from 13 different shows produced by Stephen J. Cannell Productions including all 8 episodes of Unsub.

References

External links

1989 American television series debuts
1989 American television series endings
1980s American crime drama television series
NBC original programming
Television series by 20th Century Fox Television
Television series by Stephen J. Cannell Productions
English-language television shows
Television shows filmed in Vancouver